This list is of Major Sites Protected for their Historical and Cultural Value at the National Level in the Province of Hebei, People's Republic of China.

|}

See also
 Principles for the Conservation of Heritage Sites in China

References

 
Hebei